The Rising of the North of 1569, also called the Revolt of the Northern Earls or Northern Rebellion, was an unsuccessful attempt by Catholic nobles from Northern England to depose Queen Elizabeth I of England and replace her with Mary, Queen of Scots.

Background
Elizabeth I succeeded her half-sister Mary I as queen of England in 1558. Elizabeth's accession was disputed due to the questioned legitimacy of the marriage of her parents (Henry VIII and Anne Boleyn), and Elizabeth's own questioned legitimacy due to the Act of Succession 1536. Under Henry VIII and his advisor Thomas Cromwell, power was gradually shifted from regional institutions to royal control. This course was encouraged by Elizabeth's counsellors such as William Cecil and a policy of centralization was the approach favoured by Elizabeth herself at least in regards to the northern border region.

Opponents of Elizabeth looked to Mary, Queen of Scots, the descendant of Henry VIII's sister Margaret. The claims were initially put forward by Mary's father-in-law, King Henry II of France, and Mary upheld them after her return to Scotland in 1561.

Many English Catholics, then a significant portion of the population, supported Mary's claim as a way to restore Roman Catholicism. This position was especially strong in Northern England, where several powerful nobles were Roman Catholics; there had been similar risings against Henry VIII; the Pilgrimage of Grace of 1536 and Bigod's Rebellion of 1537. Supporters of Mary hoped for aid from France (among Scots) and possibly Spain (among English). Mary's position was strengthened by the birth of her son, James, in 1566 but weakened again when she was deposed in July 1567. Following this, she fled to England and at the time of the Rising was in the custody of the Earl of Shrewsbury, on Elizabeth's orders.

Rebellion under Northumberland and Westmorland

The rebellion was led by Charles Neville, 6th Earl of Westmorland, and Thomas Percy, 7th Earl of Northumberland. Seven hundred soldiers assembled at Brancepeth Castle. In November 1569 Westmorland and Northumberland occupied Durham. Thomas Plumtree (see right) celebrated Mass in Durham Cathedral. From Durham, the rebels marched south to Bramham Moor, while Elizabeth struggled to raise forces sufficient to confront them. But, hearing of a large force being raised by the Earl of Sussex, the rebels abandoned plans to besiege York, and captured Barnard Castle instead. They proceeded to Clifford Moor, but found little popular support. Sussex marched out from York on 13 December 1569 with 10,000 men against the rebels' 6,000, and was followed by 12,000 men under Baron Clinton. The rebel earls retreated northward and finally dispersed their forces, fleeing into Scotland.

Leonard Dacre's resistance
A questionable role in the rebellion was played by Leonard Dacre, an early sympathiser of Mary. At the outbreak of the rebellion, he travelled to Elizabeth's court at Windsor to claim the heritage of his young nephew, the 5th Baron Dacre. After the latter's untimely death in 1569, this had descended to his sisters, all married to sons of Thomas Howard, 4th Duke of Norfolk. Dacre returned to Northern England, ostensibly a faithful partisan of Elizabeth, but his intentions remain unclear.

After the retreat of the rebels, he seized Greystoke Castle and fortified his own Naworth Castle, where he gathered 3,000 Cumbrian troops and tried to keep up the appearance of good relations with the Queen. He held out against a siege of the royal army under Baron Hunsdon but then attacked the retreating army at Gelt River. Though Hunsdon was outnumbered, he charged Dacre's foot with his cavalry, killing 300–400 and capturing 200–300 men. Dacre escaped via Scotland to Brussels, where he died in exile.

Reprisals
Some of the rebels escaped into Scotland. Regent Mar wrote that Agnes Gray, Lady Home, had been a busy worker to receive the rebels. Two of the leaders, the Earls of Northumberland and Westmorland, had fled into Scotland. Northumberland was captured by James Douglas, 4th Earl of Morton, and turned over to Elizabeth in 1572, who had him beheaded at York. After having been hidden at Ferniehirst Castle, Westmorland escaped to Flanders, where he died impoverished. His family lost their ancestral homes and his wife, Jane Howard, also fled to the Continent. She lived the rest of her life under house arrest. Her brother, the Duke of Norfolk, was first imprisoned, then pardoned. He was imprisoned again following the Ridolfi plot in 1571 and finally executed in 1572. Norfolk's treason charges included "comforting and relieving of the English rebels that stirred the Rebellion in the North since they have fled out of the realm." Altogether, 600 supporters of Mary were executed, while many others fled into exile.

Queen Elizabeth declared martial law, exacting terrible retribution on the ordinary folk of the Yorkshire Dales, despite the lack of any popular support for the Earls' Rising, with her demand for at least 700 executions. The victims of this purge were, as a contemporary account said "wholly of the meanest sort of people", so that hardly a village escaped the sight of a public hanging.

In 1570, Pope Pius V had tried to aid the rebellion by excommunicating Elizabeth and declaring her deposed in the papal bull Regnans in Excelsis, but the document did not arrive until the rebellion had been suppressed. The bull gave Elizabeth more reason to view Catholics with suspicion. It inspired conspiracies to assassinate her, starting with the Ridolfi plot.

In 1587, Elizabeth brought Mary, Queen of Scots, to trial for treason; she was convicted by the court and executed.

See also
 Desmond Rebellions
 Prayer Book Rebellion
 Pilgrimage of Grace

References

Further reading
 Fletcher, Anthony, and Diarmaid MacCulloch. Tudor rebellions (Routledge, 2015).
 Kesselring, Krista. The Northern Rebellion of 1569: Faith, Politics and Protest in Elizabethan England (Springer, 2007).
 Lowers, James K. Mirrors for rebels: a study of polemical literature relating to the Northern Rebellion, 1569 (University of California Press, 1953).

External links
 http://www.tudorplace.com.ar/Documents/NorthernRebellion.htm
 http://www.timetravel-britain.com/05/July/raby.shtml

Tudor rebellions
Conflicts in 1569
Conflicts in 1570
16th-century rebellions
16th-century military history of the Kingdom of England
1569 in England
1570 in England
Northern England
Catholic rebellions
Elizabeth I
Mary, Queen of Scots